Sediminitomix flava is a Gram-negative bacterium from the genus of Sediminitomix which has been isolated from marine sediments from the Okinawa Island on Japan.

References

External links
Type strain of Sediminitomix flava at BacDive -  the Bacterial Diversity Metadatabase	

Sphingobacteriia
Bacteria described in 2007